Marwari Bhojnalaya is a popular name among Marwari-style purely vegetarian restaurants in many cities in India. They are all independently owned. The term "marwari" implies that it is intended for Marwari merchants, who are strictly vegetarian and prefer relatively simple (which can be eaten daily) and inexpensive food. They are however popular among all vegetarians. The term "bhojanalaya" practically always implies simple and inexpensive vegetarian cuisine. Restaurants named "Jain Bhojanalaya" or "Vaishanva Dhaba" are also vegetarian. Note that restaurants are often called "hotel" in India. Some of them used to offer traditional seating on wooden patiyas on the floor, but the custom is no longer popular and tables and chairs are now more common.

Cuisine
In spite of the name, the food served is not necessarily Rajasthan style. For example, Dal-bati meals and dishes such as gatte ki kadhi which are quite popular in Rajasthan, are often not served, or served only on special occasion. Rich and festive Rajasthani food can be found in special restaurants such as Chokhi-dhani chain. The food is generally served in stainless steel thalis (platters). Often onions are served only on request, because many Marwaris and Jains do not eat onions.

See also
 Vaishnava
 List of vegetarian restaurants
 Vegetarianism in India

References
 

Rajasthani cuisine
Vegetarian restaurants in India
Marwar